Neville Kloppers (born ), is a Zimbabwean rugby union player who played as lock.

Career
At club level, Kloppers played for Old Johnians RFC and for the Mashonaland provincial team alongside Andy Ferreira, Malcolm Jellicoe, Andre Buitendag, Dirk Buitendag, Alex Nicholls, who would play alongside him for Zimbabwe at the 1987 Rugby World Cup. His only international cap was during the pool match against France, in Auckland on 2 June 1987.

References

External links
Neville Kloppers international stats

1961 births
Sportspeople from Harare
Zimbabwean rugby union players
Rugby union locks
White Zimbabwean sportspeople
Living people
Alumni of St. John's College (Harare)